Yuri Yakovlevich Arbachakov (born October 22, 1966) is a Russian former professional boxer who competed from 1990 to 1997. He held the WBC flyweight title from 1992 to 1997.

Amateur career

Yuri Arbachakov was born on October 22, 1966, in the village of Ust-Kezes, Kemerovo Oblast into a Shor family. 

Arbachakov was an amateur boxing star in the Soviet Union. He won both world and European amateur championships during his amateur career, and lost only 21 of 186 amateur fights.

Professional boxing career 
Arbachakov emigrated to Japan as part of the perestroika program, along with Orzubek Nazarov. He trained with the Kyoei boxing gym, and fought almost all of his fights in Japan. He made his professional debut in February, 1990, under the name "Yuri Chakov", in the bantamweight division. In 1991, his gym changed his ring name to "Yuri Ebihara," (after former world champion Hiroyuki Ebihara) and in July of that year, he won the Japanese flyweight title in his seventh professional bout, by 1st-round knockout. He defended the title once before returning it.

In June, 1992, he challenged Muangchai Kittikasem for the WBC and lineal flyweight titles, and won by 8th-round knockout. He would go on to defend his titles nine times over five years.

After winning the world titles, he took out "Ebihara" from his ring name, and began fighting as "Yuri Arbachakov." He made this change because "Ebi" closely resembles the Russian word for "fuck."

In August, 1996, he made his 9th defense by 8th-round KO, but injured his right hand during the fight. The injury forced him into a long period of inactivity.

His 10th defense was scheduled for November, 1997, over a year since his last fight. Chatchai Sasakul had become the WBC flyweight interim champion during Arbachakov's inactivity, and the two had previously fought in September, 1995, with Arbachakov emerging victorious by decision. However, Sasakul won the rematch by 12-round decision, and Arbachakov announced his retirement after the fight. His professional record was 23-1-0 (16KOs).

Professional boxing record

See also 
List of flyweight boxing champions
List of WBC world champions
List of Japanese boxing world champions
Boxing in Japan

References

External links
 
 Yuri Arbachakov - CBZ Profile

|-

1966 births
Flyweight boxers
Living people
Sportspeople from Kemerovo Oblast
Soviet male boxers
World Boxing Council champions
World flyweight boxing champions
World boxing champions
Russian male boxers
Russian expatriate sportspeople in Japan
AIBA World Boxing Championships medalists